Life-saving appliances are those appliances that protect human life at sea. The devices are documented as part of the International Convention for the Safety of Life at Sea, or SOLAS Convention.

Types  
In the SOLAS Convention and other maritime related standards, the safety of human life is paramount. Ships and other watercraft carry life saving appliances including lifeboats, lifebuoys, life-jackets, life raft and many others. Passengers and crew are informed of their availability in case of emergency. Life-saving appliances are mandatory as per chapter 3 of the SOLAS Convention. The International Life-Saving Appliance (LSA) Code gives specific technical requirements for the manufacture, maintenance and record keeping of life-saving appliances. The number and type of life-saving appliances differ from vessel to vessel, and the code gives a minimum requirement to comply in order to make a ship seaworthy.

Life-saving appliances include 
Lifebuoys and life-jackets
 Immersion suits, anti-exposure suits and thermal protective aids
Lifeboats
 Life-rafts
 Rescue boats
 Rocket parachute flares
 Hand flares
 Buoyant smoke signals
 Launching and embarkation appliances
 Marine evacuation systems
 Line-throwing appliances
 General emergency alarm system
Public address system

References 

Maritime safety
Rescue equipment